Belonastrum is a genus of diatom with uncertain classification.

Species:
 Belonastrum berolinense (Lemmermann) Round & Maidana

References

Diatoms
Diatom genera